Rafi may refer to:

Places
 Rafi, Iran, a city in Khuzestan Province
 Rafi, Abadan, a village in Khuzestan Province
 Rafi, Nigeria, a Local Government Area of Niger State

Other uses
 Rafi (name), a name of Arabic origin
 Rafi (political party), an acronym for Reshimat Poalei Yisrael (Israeli Workers List) a political party in Israel during the 1960s
 A nickname often given to people named Rafael (or Rafaela)

See also
 Raffi (disambiguation), a given name of Armenian origin
 R.A.F.I. (album), by Asian Dub Foundation
 Rafael (disambiguation)